Robert Juranic (29 May 1904 – 8 December 1973) was an Austrian footballer. He played in six matches for the Austria national football team from 1926 to 1928.

References

External links
 

1904 births
1973 deaths
Austrian footballers
Austria international footballers
Place of birth missing
Association footballers not categorized by position